Borgestad Station is a former railway station on the Vestfold Line, located at Borgestad in Skien, Norway. It was previously regarded as part of the Bratsberg Line and open as Menstad.

References

Railway stations in Vestfold og Telemark
Railway stations on the Vestfold Line
Railway stations on the Bratsberg Line
Disused railway stations in Norway
Railway stations opened in 1916
1916 establishments in Norway
Year of disestablishment missing